Trimbach may refer to:

Maison Trimbach, a winery located in Ribeauvillé, Alsace, France
Trimbach, Switzerland, a municipality in the district of Gösgen in the canton of Solothurn in Switzerland
Trimbach, Bas-Rhin, a commune in the Bas-Rhin department of the Grand Est region of France